Bhanga Pilot High School also known as Bhanga High School, is an educational institution in Bhanga, Fardipur, Bangladesh established in 1889.

References

High schools in Bangladesh
Educational institutions established in 1889
1889 establishments in India
Schools in Faridpur District